David Seco Amundarain (born March 17, 1973 in Busturia, Biscay) is a Spanish professional racing cyclist. Although he is known as a cyclo cross racer he also race road. He was part of Ripolin Bondex team in the 90s. He was on the same team as Oscar Freire and Iñaki Barrenetxea, both profesionals later on.

Career highlights

 1989: 2nd in National Championship, Cyclo-cross, Debutants, Spain, Llanes (ESP)
 1995: 3rd in Durana, Cyclo-cross (ESP)
 1995: 1st in Vedra Cyclocross (ESP)
 1995: 2nd in Leioa, Cyclo-cross (ESP)
 1996: 2nd in National Championship, Cyclo-cross, Elite, Spain, Telleriarte (ESP)
 1996: 1st in Leioa, Cyclo-cross (ESP)
 1996: 1st in Durana, Cyclo-cross (ESP)
 1996: 1st in Artxanda, Cyclo-cross (ESP)
 1996: 1st in Telleriarte, Cyclo-cross (ESP)
 1997: 2nd in National Championship, Cyclo-cross, Elite, Spain, Ispaster (ESP)
 1997: 3rd in Durana, Cyclo-cross (ESP)
 1997: 2nd in Ispaster, Cyclo-cross (ESP)
 1998: 3rd in National Championship, Cyclo-cross, Elite, Spain, Los Carrales de Buelna (ESP)
 1998: 2nd in Villena, Cyclo-cross (ESP)
 1998: 1st in Ispaster, Cyclo-cross (ESP)
 1998: 2nd in Kortgebui-Guernica, Cyclo-cross (ESP)
 1998: 1st in Urnieta, Cyclo-cross (ESP)
 1998: 2nd in Durana, Cyclo-cross (ESP)
 1998: 1st in Astarria, Cyclo-cross (ESP)
 1998: 1st in Amorebieta, Cyclo-cross (ESP)
 1999: 3rd in National Championship, Cyclo-cross, Elite, Spain (ESP)
 1999: 1st in Ispaster, Cyclo-cross (ESP)
 1999: 2nd in Nottingham, Cyclo-cross (GBR)
 1999: 1st in Zamora, Cyclo-cross (ESP)
 1999: 1st in Durana, Cyclo-cross (ESP)
 1999: 1st in Pontevedra, Cyclo-cross (ESP)
 1999: 2nd in Igorre, Cyclo-cross (ESP)
 1999: 1st in Elorrio, Cyclo-cross (ESP)
 1999: 1st in GP Navidad, Cyclo-cross (ESP)
 1999: 1st in Asteasu, Cyclo-cross (ESP)
 2000: 1st in National Championship, Cyclo-cross, Elite, Spain (ESP)
 2000: 1st in Agullent, Cyclo-cross (ESP)
 2000: 1st in Astarria, Cyclo-cross (ESP)
 2000: 3rd in Durana, Cyclo-cross (ESP)
 2000: 2nd in Vizcaya Ermua, Cyclo-cross (ESP)
 2000: 1st in Elorrio, Cyclo-cross (ESP)
 2001: 1st in Asteasu, Cyclo-cross (ESP)
 2001: 1st in National Championship, Cyclo-cross, Elite, Spain, Noja (ESP)
 2001: 1st in Guernica, Cyclo-cross (ESP)
 2001: 3rd in Ispaster, Cyclo-cross (ESP)
 2001: 1st in Ermua, Cyclo-cross (ESP)
 2001: 1st in Elorrio, Cyclo-cross (ESP)
 2001: 1st in Itsasondo, Cyclo-cross (ESP)
 2002: 1st in National Championship, Cyclo-cross, Elite, Spain (ESP)
 2002: 1st in Guernica, Cyclo-cross (ESP)
 2002: 2nd in Lekeitio, Cyclo-cross (ESP)
 2002: 2nd in Drongen-Baarle Cyclocross (BEL)
 2002: 2nd in Igorre, Cyclo-cross (ESP)
 2002: 1st in Itsasondo, Cyclo-cross (ESP)
 2003: 1st in Asteasu, Cyclo-cross (ESP)
 2003: 1st in National Championship, Cyclo-cross, Elite, Spain, Sotrondio (ESP)
 2003: 1st in Abadino, Cyclo-cross (ESP)
 2003: 1st in Muxika, Cyclo-cross (ESP)
 2003: 1st in Idiazabal, Cyclo-cross (ESP)
 2003: 1st in Ispaster, Cyclo-cross (ESP)
 2003: 1st in Ermua, Cyclo-cross (ESP)
 2003: 2nd in Igorre, Cyclo-cross (ESP)
 2003: 1st in Elorrio, Cyclo-cross (ESP)
 2003: 1st in Itsasondo, Cyclo-cross (ESP)
 2004: 1st in Vera de Bidasoa (ESP)
 2004: 2nd in Asteasu, Cyclo-cross (ESP)
 2004: 1st in National Championship, Cyclo-cross, Elite, Spain (ESP)
 2004: 1st in Abadino, Cyclo-cross (ESP)
 2004: 1st in Muxika, Cyclo-cross (ESP)
 2004: 1st in Ispaster, Cyclo-cross, Ispaster (ESP)
 2004: 1st in Karrantza, Cyclo-cross (ESP)
 2004: 1st in La Morgal, Cyclo-cross (ESP)
 2004: 1st in Santiago, Cyclo-cross (ESP)
 2004: 1st in Arnao, Cyclo-cross (ESP)
 2004: 1st in Montjuic, Cyclo-cross (ESP)
 2004: 1st in Ermua, Cyclo-cross (ESP)
 2004: 2nd in Igorre, Cyclo-cross (ESP)
 2004: 1st in Valladolid, Cyclo-cross (ESP)
 2004: 1st in Elorrio, Cyclo-cross (ESP)
 2004: 3rd in Itsasondo, Cyclo-cross (ESP)
 2005: 1st in Zeberio, Cyclo-cross (ESP)
 2005: 3rd in Asteasu, Cyclo-cross (ESP)
 2005: 2nd in National Championship, Cyclo-cross, Elite, Spain, Busturia (ESP)
 2005: 3rd in Muxika, Cyclo-cross (ESP)
 2005: 1st in Astesasu, Cyclo-cross (b) (ESP)
 2005: 1st in Karrantza, Cyclo-cross (ESP)
 2005: 1st in Lugones, Cyclo-cross (ESP)
 2005: 1st in Astarria, Cyclo-cross (ESP)
 2005: 1st in Zeberio, Cyclo-cross (b) (ESP)
 2005: 1st in Bermeo, Cyclo-cross (ESP)
 2005: 1st in Elorrio, Cyclo-cross (ESP)
 2005: 1st in Legutiano, Cyclo-cross (ESP)
 2006: 1st in Oviedo, Cyclo-cross (ESP)
 2006: 1st in National Championship, Cyclo-cross, Elite, Spain, Ribadumia (ESP)
 2006: 1st in Muxika, Cyclo-cross (ESP)
 2006: 1st in Ispaster, Cyclo-cross (ESP)
 2007: 2nd in Karrantza, Cyclo-cross (ESP)
 2007: 1st in Vilafranca del Penedés, Cyclo-cross (ESP)
 2007: 1st in Alginet, Cyclo-cross (ESP)
 2007: 1st in Ametzaga de Zuyo, Cyclo-cross (ESP)
 2007: 1st in Amezaga, Cyclo-cross (ESP)
 2007: 1st in Astarria, Cyclo-cross (ESP)
 2007: 2nd in Valencia, Cyclo-cross (ESP)
 2007: 3rd in Solares, Cyclo-cross (ESP)
 2007: 1st in Bermeo, Cyclo-cross (ESP)
 2008: 1st in Ramales, Cyclo-cross (ESP)

External links

1973 births
Living people
People from Busturialdea
Spanish male cyclists
Cyclo-cross cyclists
Sportspeople from Biscay
Cyclists from the Basque Country (autonomous community)